The Siddeshwar Express is an overnight daily superfast train connecting Solapur to Mumbai via Pune in Maharashtra, India.  As per the numbering of the Indian Railways, the train numbers are 12116 in the up direction (Solapur to Mumbai) and 12115 in the down direction (Mumbai to Solapur). It was started in 1985.

It now shares its rake with the Udyan Express.

Route

Major halts on the way are Dadar, Thane,  Kalyan, Lonavala,  Pune, Daund & Solapur.

Train halts list

Source: India Rail Info

The following is the timetable for 12115 Siddheshwar Express. For 12116 Siddheshwar Express, the timetable is just the reverse of the same.

Traction
As the entire route is fully electrified between Mumbai CSMT and Solapur, this train is hauled end to end by a kyn based wap-7

See also 
 Solapur Mumbai CST Express

External links
Mumbai-Solapur 1423 Down
Solapur-Mumbai 1424 Up

Express trains in India
Transport in Solapur
Rail transport in Maharashtra
Transport in Mumbai
Named passenger trains of India